Where Are You Going? (translit. Za kude putuvate) is a 1986 Bulgarian comedy film directed by Rangel Vulchanov. It was screened in the Un Certain Regard section the 1986 Cannes Film Festival and was entered into the main competition at the 15th Moscow International Film Festival. The film was selected as the Bulgarian entry for the Best Foreign Language Film at the 61st Academy Awards, but was not accepted as a nominee.

Cast
 Stoyan Aleksiev as Dotzent Radev
 Georgi Kaloyanchev as Bay Denyo
 Katerina Evro as Katerina
 Iossif Surchadzhiev as Strezov
 Yordan Spirov as Uchitelyat
 Katerina Angelova
 Dimo Kolarov
 Stefan Ilyev
 Vasil Dimitrov

See also
 List of submissions to the 61st Academy Awards for Best Foreign Language Film
 List of Bulgarian submissions for the Academy Award for Best Foreign Language Film

References

External links

1986 films
1986 comedy films
1980s Bulgarian-language films
Bulgarian comedy films
Films set in Bulgaria
Films shot in Bulgaria
1980s fantasy comedy films
Bulgarian satirical films
Films directed by Rangel Vulchanov